The 2005 Spa-Francorchamps GP2 Series round was a GP2 Series motor race held on September 10 and 11, 2005 at the Circuit de Spa-Francorchamps in Stavelot, Belgium. It was the penultimate round of the 2005 GP2 Series season. The race weekend supported the 2005 Belgian Grand Prix.

Classification

Qualifying

Feature race

Sprint race

Notes

References

External links
 Motorsportstats.com

Spa-Francorchamps
GP2
Auto races in Belgium